Hypercallia is a genus of gelechioid moths.

Taxonomy
In some systematic layouts, it is placed in the subfamily Amphisbatinae of the concealer moth family (Oecophoridae). Delimitation of Amphisbatinae versus the closely related Depressariinae and Oecophorinae is a major problem of Gelechioidea taxonomy and systematics, and some authors separate the former two as full-blown families (Amphisbatidae and Depressariidae), and/or include the Amphisbatinae in Depressariinae (or Depressariidae), or merge them in the Oecophorinae outright.

Species
The species of Hypercallia are:<ref>FE (2009), and see references in Savela (2001)

Hypercallia alexandra (Meyrick, 1909)
Hypercallia argyropa Meyrick, 1914
Hypercallia arista Walsingham, 1912
Hypercallia bruneri Busck, [1934]
Hypercallia catenella Zeller, 1877
Hypercallia chaldaica (Meyrick, 1913)
Hypercallia chionastra Meyrick, 1926
Hypercallia chionopis Meyrick, 1916
Hypercallia citrinalis (Scopoli, 1763)
Hypercallia citroclista Meyrick, 1930
Hypercallia cnephaea (Walsingham, 1912)
Hypercallia crocatella Zeller, 1877
Hypercallia cupreata (Dognin, 1905)
Hypercallia cuprones van Gijen, 1912
Hypercallia cyathopa (Meyrick, 1913)
Hypercallia diplotrocha Meyrick, 1937
Hypercallia gnorisma (Walsingham, 1912)
Hypercallia haematella (Felder, 1875)
Hypercallia halobapta Meyrick, 1930
Hypercallia heliodepta Meyrick, 1932
Hypercallia heliomima Meyrick, 1930
Hypercallia heterochroma Clarke, 1971
Hypercallia incensella Zeller, 1877
Hypercallia inguinaris van Gijen, 1912
Hypercallia leucothyrsa (Meyrick, 1938)
Hypercallia longimaculata (Dognin, 1905)
Hypercallia loxochorda Meyrick, 1926
Hypercallia lydia (Druce, 1901)
Hypercallia miltopa (Meyrick, 1912)
Hypercallia miniata (Dognin, 1905)
Hypercallia niphocycla Meyrick, 1926
Hypercallia obliquistriga Dognin, 1905
Hypercallia orthochaeta (Meyrick, 1913)
Hypercallia phlebodes (Walsingham, 1912)
Hypercallia psittacopa (Meyrick, 1912)
Hypercallia pyrarcha Meyrick, 1910
Hypercallia rhodosarca (Walsingham, 1912)
Hypercallia sarcodes Diakonoff, 1954
Hypercallia sincera Meyrick, 1909
Hypercallia subreticulata Walsingham, 1881
Hypercallia syntoma (Walsingham, 1912)
Hypercallia unilorata (Meyrick, 1933)

Former species
Hypercallia calidaria Meyrick, 1921

Footnotes

References
 Fauna Europaea (FE) (2009): Hypercallia. Version 2.1, 2009-DEC-22. Retrieved 2012-JAN-27.
 Pitkin, Brian & Jenkins, Paul (2004): Butterflies and Moths of the World, Generic Names and their Type-species – Hypercallia. Version of 2004-NOV-05. Retrieved 2012-JAN-27.
 Savela, Markku (2001): Markku Savela's Lepidoptera and some other life forms – Hypercallia. Version of 2001-NOV-07. Retrieved 2012-JAN-27.

 
Hypercalliinae
Taxa named by James Francis Stephens